Katherine "Kat" Westbury (born 14 March 1993) is a Thai-New Zealand tennis player.

She reached her best singles ranking of world No. 576 on 3 October 2011, and made her WTA Tour debut at the 2015 Auckland Open.

Westbury has two brothers. At age of three she moved to Bangkok, Thailand with her parents where she attended pre-school and primary school. Westbury began playing tennis at the age of 6 at the British Club in Bangkok. Her family returned to New Zealand two years later, settling in Christchurch, where she attended Burnside Primary School and Cobham Intermediate School, while also playing on the Canterbury Tennis Regional Squad under coach Glenn Wilson. In 2005 the family moved to Sydney, before further re-locating to Burwood East, Victoria, where she still resides.

Tennis career

2015
Having played doubles in just one previous ITF tournament, and that being six years earlier, Westbury was awarded a wildcard into the Auckland Open with Rosie Cheng, where they were beaten by Petra Martić and Anna Tatishvili in the first round.

2018
Westbury played her first Fed Cup matches for New Zealand in Bahrain in February 2018. She won her only singles rubber, and won one and lost one doubles rubber.

2020
Westbury resumed her professional career in 2020, starting at the reintroduced ITF tournament in Hamilton. She reached the semifinals of both singles and doubles, and followed that by reaching the second round of singles in Mildura before international tennis was suspended due to the COVID-19 pandemic. She resumed after the break with a series of tournaments in Monastir, Tunisia.

2022
Westbury played one Billie Jean King Cup (formerly Fed Cup) match for New Zealand in April but, more importantly, won her first professional title when partnering Destanee Aiava to win an ITF doubles title in Traralgon, Australia, at the end of November.

ITF Circuit finals

Singles: 2 (2 runner-ups)

Doubles: 1 (1 title)

Fed Cup participation

Singles

Doubles

External links
 
 
 

1993 births
Living people
New Zealand female tennis players
Katherine Westbury
Katherine Westbury
Sportspeople from Hamilton, New Zealand
Sportswomen from Victoria (Australia)
New Zealand people of Thai descent
Tennis players from Melbourne
People from Burwood, Victoria